Bianca Xunise is an American cartoonist, illustrator, and self-described "goth of color". Her work is nationally syndicated through the Six Chix comic strip collaborative.

Early life 
Xunise was born in Chicago to artistic parents; her mother was a fashion designer. Her family has Creole roots. She started as a fashion blogger, but quit "because they didn't want to indict George Zimmerman in the Trayvon Martin case and after that I realized I [didn't] care what I'm wearing anymore."

Career 
Xunise's influences include Finnish artist Tove Jansson, Austrian children's book illustrator Ludwig Bemelmans, and Japanese manga artist Naoko Takeuchi. She credits her professional start in comics to online community for women Hello Giggles, which gave her a column in 2015. Xunise had been featured in the Nib and Shondaland when King Features Syndicate asked her to create a Popeye tribute strip. In 2018 she won the Ignatz Award for "Promising New Talent" for her self-published "Say Her Name", which deals with the anxiety of being black in America.

In 2020, she became the second Black woman contributing to a nationally syndicated strip, when she became one of the Six Chix. She was preceded in this distinction by Barbara Brandon-Croft, whose daily strip Where I'm Coming From was nationally syndicated from 1991 to 2005. With her Six Chix debut, Xunise also became the first Black nonbinary cartoonist to be nationally syndicated.

References

External links 

 Official website
 "Say Her Name" - on Southsideweekly.com

Living people
American comic strip cartoonists
American illustrators
Artists from Chicago
21st-century American women artists
21st-century American artists
American female comics artists
American people of Creole descent
Ignatz Award winners
University of Illinois Chicago alumni
DePaul University faculty
Year of birth missing (living people)
American women illustrators
African-American comics creators
African-American illustrators
American women cartoonists
American women academics
21st-century African-American women
21st-century African-American artists